This is a list of films that have won awards at the Reel Affirmations film festival, an American festival of LGBT-related films held annually in Washington, D.C.

This list is organized by the year in which the award was given. Reel Affirmations film festivals are referred to by the order in which they occurred. For example, the sixth Reel Affirmations film fest is called "RA 6" in film festival shorthand, and occurred in 1996.

For many years, Reel Affirmations presented four major awards each year: Best Feature, Best Documentary, Best Male Short, and Best Female Short.  Each award is bestowed based on audience balloting. The festival also 

Beginning in 2000, the festival also distributed a Plant-A-Seed grant at the end of each festival.  The grant was awarded by the One In Ten board to a filmmaker or filmmakers who have previously produced a feature film, short or documentary, and was intended to help the filmmaker complete a current work in progress. The grant was established in 2000. It was supported by audience donations and a silent auction held throughout each year's festival, and varied in amount from year to year.  The grant award was discontinued in 2008.

Beginning in 2011, Reel Affirmations added three new awards. These included a First Time Director and a Best International Movie award. The festival also re-established its film completion grant award, renaming it the Keith Clark & Barry Becker Filmmaker Award (in honor of the co-founders of the festival).

Reel Affirmations award winners
2011 (RA 20):
Best Feature: Pariah
Best Documentary: VitoBest Male Short: I Don't Want to Go Back AloneBest Female Short: Cried SuicideBest International Movie: Mary LouBest First-Time Director: Sal Bardo, for Requited
Keith Clark & Barry Becker Filmmaker Award: Michele Josue and Liam McNill, to assist with the completion of the documentary Matthew Shepard Is A Friend of Mine
2010:Due to financial difficulties, the Reel Affirmations film festival was not held in 2010.2009 (RA 19):
Best Feature: No awards givenBest Documentary: No awards givenBest Male Short: No awards givenBest Female Short: No awards given2008 (RA 18):
Best Feature: Save MeBest Documentary: In Sickness and In HealthBest Male Short: 41 Sekunden (41 Seconds)
Best Female Short: Worst Case Scenario: Butch EditionPlant-A-Seed grant: This grant was discontinued in 20082007 (RA 17): 
Best Feature: The King and the ClownBest Documentary: For the Bible Tells Me SoBest Male Short: Peking TurkeyBest Female Short: HappenstancePlant-A-Seed grant: Stu Maddux and Joe Applebaum

2006 (RA 16): 
Best Feature: C.R.A.Z.Y.Best Documentary: The Life of ReillyBest Male Short: Implication (Implicación)
Best Female Short: Hi Maya (Hoi Maya)
Plant-A-Seed grant: Carlos Portugal

2005 (RA 15):
Best Feature: little manBest Documentary: Just Between UsBest Male Short: Ryan's LifeBest Female Short: Getting to Know YouPlant-A-Seed grant: Sarah Kellogg

2004 (RA 14):
Best Feature: Not knownBest Documentary: Not knownBest Male Short: Not knownBest Female Short: Not knownPlant-A-Seed grant: Not known2003 (RA 13): 
Best Feature: Latter DaysBest Documentary: No Secret Anymore: The Times of Del Martin & Phyllis LyonBest Male Short: A Bear's StoryBest Female Short: The Ten Rules (A Lesbian Survival Guide)Plant-A-Seed grant: Erin Greenwell

2002 (RA 12): 
Best Feature: Friends & FamilyBest Documentary: Swimming Upstream: A Year in the Life of Karen & JennyBest Male Short: BoychickBest Female Short: Wilma's SacrificePlant-A-Seed grant: Todd Stephens

2001 (RA 11):
Best Feature: Not knownBest Documentary: Not knownBest Male Short: Not knownBest Female Short: Not knownPlant-A-Seed grant: Paula Goldberg

2000 (RA 10):
Best Feature: Not knownBest Documentary: Not knownBest Male Short: Not knownBest Female Short: Not knownPlant-A-Seed grant: Patrik-Ian Polk

1999 (RA 9):
Best Feature: Not knownBest Documentary: Not knownBest Male Short: Not knownBest Female Short: Not known1998 (RA 8):
Best Feature: Not knownBest Documentary: Not knownBest Male Short: Not knownBest Female Short: Not known1997 (RA 7):
Best Feature: Not knownBest Documentary: Not knownBest Male Short: Not knownBest Female Short: Not known1996 (RA 6):
Best Feature: Not knownBest Documentary: Not knownBest Male Short: Not knownBest Female Short: Not known1995 (RA 5):
Best Feature: Not knownBest Documentary: Not knownBest Male Short: Not knownBest Female Short: Not known1994 (RA 4):
Best Feature: Not knownBest Documentary: Not knownBest Male Short: Not knownBest Female Short: Not known1993 (RA 3):
Best Feature: Not knownBest Documentary: Not knownBest Male Short: Not knownBest Female Short: Not known1992 (RA 2):
Best Feature: Not knownBest Documentary: Not knownBest Male Short: Not knownBest Female Short: Not known1991 (RA 1):
Best Feature: Not knownBest Documentary: Not knownBest Male Short: Not knownBest Female Short: Not known''

Notes

Lists of films by award
Lists of LGBT-related films

Reel Affirmations